Ivann Espag (born 8 September 1987) is a South African rugby union footballer, currently playing for club side Rustenburg Impala. His regular playing position is prop.

He was released by the Pumas at the end of 2013.

In 2013, he was included in a South Africa President's XV team that played in the 2013 IRB Tbilisi Cup and won the tournament after winning all three matches.

References

External links

itsrugby.co.uk profile

Living people
1987 births
South African rugby union players
Rugby union props
Rugby union players from Johannesburg
White South African people
Griquas (rugby union) players
Pumas (Currie Cup) players
Blue Bulls players
Boland Cavaliers players